Beirut Hotel the third long feature film by Lebanese director Danielle Arbid, is a 2011 Lebanese film. The film premiered during the 2011 Locarno International Film Festival.

Plot
One evening, a married young singer Zoha meets the French lawyer Mathieu in a night club in Beirut. Mathieu will become suspected of spying, while Zoha is trying to flee from her husband. Despite these problems, the two will witness a love story for few days mixed with violence and fear.

Cast
 Darine Hamze as Zoha
 Rodney El Haddad as Hicham
 Charles Berling as Mathieu
 Karl Sarafidis as Rabih
 Fadi Abi Samra as Abbas

Nominations
Golden Leopard during the 2011 Locarno Film Festival.

Controversy
The movie was banned from viewing in Lebanon due to mentioning the Hariri assassination in the plot.

References

External links

2011 films
2010s Arabic-language films
2010s French-language films
2011 romantic drama films
French romantic drama films
Swedish romantic drama films
Films set in Lebanon
French spy films
Swedish spy films
Lebanese drama films
2011 multilingual films
Lebanese multilingual films
Films directed by Danielle Arbid
2010s French films
2010s Swedish films